The 1926 JBUs Pokalturnering (Unofficial English translation: 1926 JBU Cup, 1926 Jutland Cup) was the 3rd edition of the regional tournament, JBUs Pokalturnering, the highest senior cup competition organised by the Jutland FA (JBU). The tournament was held in the third and fourth quarter of 1926 with Aalborg BK as the defending cup champions. The season was launched on 22 August 1926 with the first round, embraced five cup rounds and concluded on 21 November 1926 with the cup final. A total of 29 clubs participated in the cup tournament, which was the same number of teams as the previous season.

Aalborg BK won the cup tournament for the third consecutive time, by winning the final on 21 November 1926 in Ringkjøbing against regional top-flight league rivals Esbjerg fB. The cup final was a repeat of the last season's cup final in Vejle. Aalborg BK outscored their opponents 33–6 on aggregate in the five games played in this year's competition, while Esbjerg fB reached the final in four games due to a bye in the second round.

Participants

The following 29 senior teams from the Jutland FA's then three tier league system, 1925–26 JBUs Mesterskabsrække (3 clubs), the 1925–26 JBUs A-række (23 clubs) and the 1925–26 JBUs B-række (3 clubs), signed up for the cup tournament. From the JBUs Mesterskabsrække, Aarhus GF and Vejle BK did not take part in this season – Aarhus GF redrew their original registration due to the new format of the regional top-flight league, while Vejle BK was of the opinion that the costs were too large in relation to the significance and interest of the cup matches. Horsens FS participated with their reserve team, that had been promoted to the 1926–27 JBUs Mesterskabsrække, and not the first senior team.

Matches

Bracket

First Round Proper
The first round proper of the cup tournament was played on Sunday, 22 August 1926 in 13 different cities. No Aarhus-based club progressed to the next round. The draw for the first round by the Jutland FA took place on 13 August 1926. Brande IF received a bye to the second round.

Second Round Proper
The initial match schedule for the regional cup tournament was published on 1 September 1926 by the Jutland FA. The matches in the second round was scheduled for Sunday, 5 September 1926. Esbjerg fB received a bye to the third round.

Quarter-finals
The matches in the quarterfinals were originally scheduled to be played on 26 September 1926, but were moved several weeks to 7 November 1926.

Semi-finals
The semi-finals were both played on 14 November 1926.

Cup Final

Match summary
The cup final was a repeat of the last season's cup final featuring the same teams and was played on Ringkjøbing IFs Bane in Ringkjøbing on 21 November 1926. The entire match was plagued by rain, which affected the game on the field and the attendance figures. The line-up of Aalborg BK consisted of one reserve player as replacement for the regular half back, Egon Thon. Esbjerg fB featured the same line-up, that had played in the club's semi-final match, with the exception that Niels Pedersen was included as right innerwing in the squad instead of Magnus Hansen, that was injured.

15 minutes into the first half, Aalborg BK's Alex Willadsen was injured to his knee, but was able to resume playing. Aalborg BK netted four goals (one being scored via penalty kick) and dominated the first half, while Esbjerg fB was the constant attacking part, scored the most goals in the second half. For the third consecutive year, Aalborg BK secured the cup championship in the JBUs Pokalturnering by winning the match 5–3 against league rivals Esbjerg fB – the trophy had to be won a total of five times for a club to obtain it permanently.

Match details

References

JBUs Pokalturnering
1926–27 in Danish football
Denmark